Hans Karolus Ommedal (16 January 1901 – 23 October 1984) was a Norwegian politician for the Christian Democratic Party.

He was born in Gloppen and was elected to the Norwegian Parliament from Sogn og Fjordane in 1954, and was re-elected on two occasions. Ommedal was mayor of Alversund municipality 1945–1946.

References

1901 births
1984 deaths
Christian Democratic Party (Norway) politicians
Members of the Storting
20th-century Norwegian politicians